Roman Romanchuk may refer to:

 Roman Romanchuk (boxer) (1979–2016), Russian boxer
 Roman Romanchuk (footballer) (born 1986), Ukrainian footballer